Lee Andrew White (born May 9, 1946) is a former American football running back.  After playing college football at Weber State University, he joined the New York Jets as the 17th pick in the 1968 Common Draft. He was on the Jets' roster for the 1968 AFL Championship victory over the Oakland Raiders, and for the third AFL-NFL World Championship game, in which the AFL's Jets defeated the NFL's champion Baltimore Colts.

Lee White played for the Jets for four years, until he was traded to the NFL's Los Angeles Rams. With the Rams he played several games, but found it hard to settle into the area.

White was traded along with Deacon Jones and Greg Wojcik from the Rams to the San Diego Chargers for Jeff Staggs, a second rounder in 1972 (30th overall–Jim Bertelsen) and a second and third rounder in 1973 (31st and 60th overall–Cullen Bryant and Tim Stokes respectively) on January 29, 1972. He retired in 1973.

See also 
 Other American Football League players
 On the TV series The Wonder Years, Kevin wears a New York Jets jersey #34 in an episode ("Rock N' Roll") set in 1970.  Lee White wore that jersey number from 1968-1970.

References

External links
New York Jets profile page

1946 births
American football running backs
Living people
Los Angeles Rams players
New York Jets players
Players of American football from Nevada
San Diego Chargers players
Sportspeople from Las Vegas
Weber State Wildcats football players
American Football League players